Ravenscourt Baptist Church is a church in Ravenscourt Road, Hammersmith, London.

The building dates from the 1970s.

References

External links
 

Hammersmith
Churches in the London Borough of Hammersmith and Fulham
20th-century Baptist churches in the United Kingdom
Hammersmith